The 201st Regional Support Group (201st RSG) is a regional support group of the United States Army and the Georgia Army National Guard. It was established as of October 1, 2013 from the former 78th Homeland Response Force. It is formally designated the "'Region IV HRF / 201st RSG"'. On November 1, 2010, the 201st RSG became the 201st Homeland Response Force. On October 1, 2013, it took its current designation.

Once home-stationed in Decatur, it has, since Jan. 11, 2011, occupied the former headquarters of Naval Air Station Atlanta at what has become the Clay National Guard Center since late September 2009. As 2011 progressed, many of the units that make up the Region IV HRF have been relocated from their present armories to facilities at Clay.

Mission 
The Region IV HRF / 201st RSG mission is to man, train and equip a homeland response force that can provide a response capability to assist civil authorities in saving lives and mitigating suffering in response to a chemical, biological, radiological, nuclear, and explosives incident. At the same time, the 201st must provide trained and ready troops to support overseas contingency operations.

The HRFs are designed to foster a dialogue between regional first responders and other agencies. The Region IV HRF plays an important role at the regional level in terms of helping develop and build regional plans and in working with southeastern emergency managers to build a functioning and cohesive connective tissue at the regional level. One of the important concerns the HRF construction seeks to alleviate is the need to respond to multiple, simultaneous disasters. Through these HRFs, the Georgia Department of Defense has the federal capacity to command and control response to multiple disasters or emergencies throughout the nation, simultaneously.

Deployments 

Since the September 11, 2001 attacks, every unit assigned to the Region IV HRF has mobilized and deployed in support of Overseas Contingency Operations, serving in Iraq, Afghanistan and various military bases across the United States.

On February 8, 2009, The 110th Combat Sustainment Support Battalion prepared to deploy to Iraq for a year-long mission. While there, the 110th acted as higher headquarters for active, Guard and Reserve units, while also upgrading and repairing the equipment destined for return stateside as part of the draw-down of forces from Iraq.

In Spring 2011, the 201st Regional Support Group-Agriculture Development Team 1 deployed to Southeastern Afghanistan. It is the first of three such Georgia Teams that are part of the National Guard Program to help the Afghans improve their farming and agribusiness techniques, thereby enhancing the country's agricultural economy and steering Afghan farmers away from growing poppy, which is used for making heroin.

In July 2018, the Headquarters / Headquarters Company (HHC) of the 201st RSG deployed to Iraq for a 9 month deployment. The mission was to conduct Base Operations in three separate locations in Iraq. Each location had a Base Operational Support - Integrator (BOS-I) staff that managed daily base operations and security. In addition to the BOS-I mission, the Brigade Commander and the Senior Enlisted Advisor of the 201st RSG deployed to Iraq to serve as the base command team for Al Asad Air Base.

Units 
201st  Regional Support Group, Dobbins Air Reserve Base, Marietta.
170th Military Police Battalion, Decatur, Georgia.
190th  Military Police Company, Kennesaw, Georgia (Deactivated - September 20th, 2019)
178th  Military Police Company, Monroe, Georgia
179th  Military Police Company, Savannah, Georgia
  4th  Civil Support Team, Marietta.
Joint  Task Force 265th CHEM BN.
116th  Medical Group ANG, Robins AFB, Georgia
248th  Medical Company, Marietta, Georgia
165th  Services Squadron ANG, Savannah, Georgia
138th  Chemical Company, Dobbins Air Reserve Base, Marietta.
810th  Engineer Company, Swainsboro, Georgia
202nd  Explosive Ordnance Detachment, Marietta.
870th  Engineer Detachment, Decatur, Georgia.
1177th Transportation Company, LaGrange, Georgia
283rd  Combat Communication Squadron, Marietta

Other HRF locations 
There are ten HRFs in the National Guard throughout the nation, one per FEMA region. This allows closer and more familiar correspondence with regional and civilian responders. As a result, the reaction time to disasters will be much faster due to geographical locations. The 10 HRF (one per FEMA region) Guard Forces will consist of 577 personnel and be composed of:

 C2 (brigade/battalion level)
 Security Force
 Search and Extraction
 Decon
 Medical
 Fatality Search and Recovery Team

References

External links 
Georgia Department of Defense Website
Official Facebook
The Professional Guardsman Blog
Official Flickr Page

Support groups of the United States Army
Military units and formations in Georgia (U.S. state)
Military units and formations established in 2013